Bridgewater railway station was located on the Bridgewater line, serving the Adelaide Hills suburb of Bridgewater. It was located 37.6 km from Adelaide station.

History
Bridgewater station opened in the 1880s and was the terminus of the now defunct Bridgewater line. The station consisted of three platforms. Platform 1 was a side platform that was 140 metres long, and platforms 2 and 3 were an island platform 170 metres long. On 1 March 1978, the station became the eastern boundary of the State Transport Authority network. 

The station building on the main platform was burned down by arsonists in 1983. The station closed on 23 September 1987, when the State Transport Authority withdrew services on the route between Belair and Bridgewater. The offices and island platform were demolished around 1990, while the brick relay console and main platform were demolished in November 2006. A small part of the platform fencing, light poles, and the dirt mound that formed platform 1 are all that remain of the station.

References

 South Australian Railways Working Timetable Book No. 265 effective 10:00am, Sunday, 30 June 1974

External links
 Flickr gallery
 Johnny's Pages gallery

Buildings and structures in Australia destroyed by arson
Disused railway stations in South Australia
Railway stations closed in 1987
1987 disestablishments in Australia